Have Yourself a Merry Little Christmas is a Christmas extended play (EP) by Canadian singer Diana Krall, released on November 3, 1998, by Impulse! Records and GRP Records.

Critical reception

Marvin Jolly of AllMusic wrote in his review, "The distanced cool of Diana Krall's vocals lends itself well to the wintry flavor of the three holiday favorites which comprise her Have Yourself a Merry Little Christmas EP."

Track listing

Track information and credits adapted from the album's liner notes.

Musicians
Diana Krall – piano, vocals
Jeff Hamilton – drums
Russell Malone – guitar
Ben Wolfe – bass
Johnny Mandel – conductor, orchestral arrangements

Production
Tommy LiPuma – Producer
Johnny Mandel – Producer
Doug Sax – Mastering
Al Schmitt – Engineer, Mixing
Koji Egawa – Assistant Engineer
Steve Genewick – Assistant Engineer
Bill Smith – Assistant Engineer
Marsha Black – Production Coordination
Hollis King – Art Direction
Kazumi Matsumoto – Graphic Design
Nigel Parry – Photography

Charts

Weekly charts

Year-end charts

References

1998 debut EPs
Albums recorded at Capitol Studios
Christmas EPs
Diana Krall albums
GRP Records albums
Impulse! Records albums
1998 Christmas albums